Angelica Ross (born November 28, 1980) is an American actress, businesswoman, and transgender rights advocate. A self-taught computer programmer, she went on to become founder and CEO of TransTech Social Enterprises, a firm that helps employ transgender people in the tech industry.

Ross began her acting career in the web series Her Story (2016), after which she received further recognition and critical acclaim for her starring roles in the drama series Pose (2018–2021) and the anthology horror series American Horror Story (2019–present), both from FX.

Early life
Angelica Ross was born on November 28, 1980 in Kenosha, Wisconsin, then raised to the north in nearby Racine. Ross, a trans woman, has said she was perceived as feminine from a young age. In 1998, when she was 17, she came out as gay to her mother, an evangelical Christian. Her mother did not receive the news well; according to Ross, "she told me I should commit suicide or she would, because she couldn't have someone like me as her child." Ross considered ending her own life and overdosed on medication, but survived.

Upon graduating high school at 17, Ross briefly attended the University of Wisconsin–Parkside before dropping out after one semester. Ross decided to join the U.S. Navy (after her parents signed a waiver so that she could join as a minor) in order to qualify for the G.I. Bill. Ross initially moved to Rochester, New York, before being stationed in Yokosuka, Kanagawa. After six months of service, she requested and received an "uncharacterized" discharge under the "Don't Ask Don't Tell" policy (which was then in force) due to being harassed by enlisted men who coerced her into saying she was gay.

Ross moved back home, and made friends with a drag queen named Traci Ross who helped her begin her gender transition at the age of 19. Upon discovering that she was transitioning, her mother threw her out and Ross moved in with her biological father (who was slightly more accepting of her) in Roanoke, Virginia. Although Ross and her parents were estranged for a time, she states that they have since mended their relationship. During the six years that she lived in Roanoke, Ross worked as a waitress at Applebee's so she could earn enough money to pay rent and attend cosmetology school. She was let go from her waitress job due to discrimination. Ross then moved to Hollywood, Florida and worked as a model and escort, then web manager, until 2003. She started a web development and graphic design business and took acting classes. She later moved to Chicago to become the employment coordinator for the Trans Life Center.

Acting career
In 2005, Ross made her acting debut in the comedy film Natale a Miami, followed by a role in the short film Bella Maddo (2010). In 2016, Ross received recognition for starring in Her Story, a web series about trans women in Los Angeles. The series was nominated for a Primetime Emmy Award for Outstanding Short Form Comedy or Drama. In 2017, she made guest appearances in the CBS legal drama series Doubt, the TNT crime drama series Claws, and the Amazon Prime Video comedy-drama series Transparent. She also executive produced and starred in the short film Missed Connections, which went on to be an official selection at Outfest 2017, Baltimore International Black Film Festival 2017, La Femme International Film Festival 2017, and Outflix Film Festival 2017 in Memphis, Tennessee. In June 2017, Ross provided voice work for the Amazon Video animated series Danger & Eggs.

Her breakthrough role came in 2018, as Candy Ferocity in Ryan Murphy's FX drama series Pose. For her performance, she earned critical acclaim. She went on to star as psychologist Donna Chambers in the FX anthology horror series American Horror Story: 1984, which made her the first transgender actress to secure two series regular roles. The series was also her second collaboration with Murphy. Her performance garnered critical acclaim by fans and critics alike. In 2021 Ross returned as a series regular for the show's tenth season.

In 2020, Ross signed a deal with Pigeon to develop its television projects. She portrays Georgia, a transgender woman, in the 2022 film Framing Agnes. Ross made her Broadway debut as Roxie Hart in the musical Chicago in a limited engagement from September 12 to November 6, 2022.

Tech career
Ross taught herself coding, and started her journey in the technology industry in web management. She also learned graphic design and photography using videos online, taking photos for rappers and designing backstage passes. Ross later was hired by the Chicago House's TransLife Center which caters to trans individuals seeking employment, housing and other aid. Her role focused on employment coordination program development.

In 2014, Ross founded the company TransTech Social Enterprises, acting as CEO. She is also the president of Miss Ross, Inc. and founded the TransTech Summit. Ross described the goals of TransTech as including to foster skills in the technology industry, especially for trans people. As the world became more digitized, Ross saw the opportunity for expanding remote working via telecommunication as there can be flexible solutions to workplace issues.

Activism
Ross launched TransTech Social Enterprises in Chicago in 2014. The nonprofit creative design firm trains and contracts transgender and other workers. Melissa Harris-Perry brought more attention to the firm in 2015, choosing Ross as her show's first "Foot Soldier" of the year. Educating others on the mission of the firm included MSNBC airing a documentary about it. Ross was a featured speaker at the 2015 White House LGBTQ Tech and Innovation Summit. She was also a celebrity ambassador to the 50th Anniversary Stonewall celebration that took place in June 2019 during Pride. On September 20, 2019, Ross hosted the 2020 Presidential Candidate Forum on LGBTQ Issues. This made her the first openly transgender person to host an American presidential forum. On September 28, 2019, Ross was a featured speaker at the National Trans Visibility March in Washington D.C.

Personal life
Ross was once engaged, but called off the engagement as her fiancé did not want others to know that Ross was transgender. She is a practicing Buddhist.

Filmography

Film

Television

Awards and nominations

Honors
 In 2015, Ross was named "1st Foot Soldier of the Year" by Melissa Harris-Perry 
 In June 2019, to mark the 50th anniversary of the Stonewall riots, an event widely considered a watershed moment in the modern LGBTQ rights movement, Queerty named her one of the Pride50 "trailblazing individuals who actively ensure society remains moving towards equality, acceptance and dignity for all queer people".

References

External links
 
 TransTech Social Enterprises web site
 

African-American actresses
African-American female military personnel
American computer programmers
American television actresses
American women chief executives
LGBT African Americans
LGBT Buddhists
American LGBT businesspeople
American LGBT actors
American LGBT rights activists
LGBT people from Wisconsin
Living people
People from Racine, Wisconsin
Transgender rights activists
Transgender actresses
African-American company founders
American company founders
American women company founders
Transgender military personnel
American military personnel discharged for homosexuality
People from Kenosha, Wisconsin
21st-century American actresses
Actresses from Wisconsin
American Buddhists
Women in the United States Navy
21st-century African-American women
21st-century African-American people
20th-century African-American people
21st-century LGBT people
20th-century African-American women
African-American United States Navy personnel
1980 births